Arbatskaya is a station on the Arbatsko–Pokrovskaya line of the Moscow Metro. Along with Smolenskaya and Kievskaya, it was built in 1953 to replace an older, parallel section of track which has since become part of the Filyovskaya line. The old station had been damaged in a German bomb attack in 1941, so its replacement was much deeper and included larger stations that could double as shelters (especially in the event of nuclear attack). Although it was initially supposed to be closed permanently, the old section reopened five years later, creating the somewhat confusing situation of having two pairs of completely separate stations with the same names (Arbatskaya and Smolenskaya).

Arbatskaya was designed by Leonid Polyakov, Valentin Pelevin and Yury Zenkevich. Since it was meant to serve as a bomb shelter as well as a Metro station, Arbatskaya is both large (the 250-m platform is the second-longest in Moscow) and deep (41 m underground). The main tunnel is elliptical in cross-section, an unusual departure from the standard circular design. The station features low, square pylons faced with red marble and a high vaulted ceiling elaborately decorated with ornamental brackets, floral reliefs, and chandeliers.

Transfers
From this station passengers can transfer to Biblioteka Imeni Lenina on the Sokolnicheskaya line, Aleksandrovsky Sad on the Filyovskaya line, and Borovitskaya on the Serpukhovsko–Timiryazevskaya line. Despite the name, however, it is not possible to transfer to Arbatskaya on the Filyovskaya line.

In popular culture

The station, alongside Aleksandrovskiy Sad, Biblioteka Lenina, and Borovitskaya, makes up the 'city-state' of Polis in the Metro 2033 series of games and novels.

Gallery

External links

metro.ru
mymetro.ru
KartaMetro.info – Station location and exits on Moscow map (English/Russian)

Moscow Metro stations
Railway stations in Russia opened in 1953
Arbatsko-Pokrovskaya Line
Railway stations located underground in Russia